Somsak Chunharas is a Thai medical doctor and public health official. He served as Deputy Minister of Public Health from 2014–2015, and has been a member of numerous national and international health committees and advisory boards. He also is President of the National Health Foundation of Thailand.

Publications 
 Swanson RC, Atun R, Best A, Betigeri A, de Campos F, Chunharas S, Collins T, Currie G, Jan S, McCoy D, Omaswa F, Sanders D, Sundararaman T, Van Damme W. Strengthening health systems in low-income countries by enhancing organizational capacities and improving institutions. Global Health. 2015 Feb 12; 11:5. ; .
 Russell E, Swanson RC, Atun R, Nishtar S, Chunharas S. Systems thinking for the post-2015 agenda. Lancet. 2014 Jun 21; 383(9935):2124-5. .
 Swanson RC, Cattaneo A, Bradley E, Chunharas S, Atun R, Abbas KM, Katsaliaki K, Mustafee N, Mason Meier B, Best A. Rethinking health systems strengthening: key systems thinking tools and strategies for transformational change. Health Policy Plan. 2012 Oct; 27 Suppl 4:iv54-61. ; .
 Chunharas S. An interactive integrative approach to translating knowledge and building a "learning organization" in health services management. Bull World Health Organ. August 2006; 84(8):652-7. ; .

References 

Somsak Chunharas
Somsak Chunharas
World Health Organization officials
Somsak Chunharas
Living people
Somsak Chunharas
Somsak Chunharas
1953 births
Somsak Chunharas